Born in 1951 in El Nuhud, Sudan and currently working in Domessargues, France; Hassan Musa is one of the Sudanese pioneers in contemporary art and zoomorphic calligraphy. Musa’s artworks are known to adapt, mix and combine diverse styles from contrasting parts of the world: his stylistic inspirations are rooted from European painting, Arabic calligraphy and Chinese watercolor. Musa’s paintings gather printed textiles which are utilized as canvas. Its theme habitually appropriates classical Western artworks to approach and challenge well-known figures such as Osama bin Laden, Che Guevara, Vincent van Gogh or Josephine Baker. One of the most well-known statements of the artist is “Images are like blows: we receive them, we give them back. We transmit violent things because that is the way we receive them. It's a way to survive, my images are my line of defense”. Musa here elaborates on how he uses his interpretation on western politics, culture and art to revive images present in the world through giving it back to the people.

Education
Musa earned a master's degree from the College of Fine and Applied Art at the Sudan University of Science and Technology, Khartoum, in 1976 and a doctorate in Fine Art and Art History from the University of Montpellier, France, in 1979.

Work
Musa's large works are often executed using textile ink on printed textile, creatively blending the designs of the fabric with his own paintings. In his art, which he does not consider as 'African', Musa often appropriates classical Western masterpieces, such as The Gleaners by Jean-François Millet or Olympia by Édouard Manet. Confronting and mixing these classical images with later personalities such as Vincent van Gogh, Josephine Baker, Che Guevara or Osama bin Laden, Musa creates a critical view on Western art, politics and culture.

Furthermore, he has created mail art, calligraphy, engravings and has illustrated books.

Exhibitions
Alongside gallery exhibitions, Musa's works have been shown at:

See also 

 Visual arts of Sudan
 Contemporary African art

References

Further reading

External links
 Artist's official website
 Hassan Musa at Grove Art Online
 Hassan Musa at the Sudan Artists Gallery
Hassan Musa, Performance and Persona, 1992-2007, in Artists and Art Education in Africa, Elsbeth Court et al, eds., Sajid Rizvi, Series ed.  Saffron Books African Art and Society Series, ISSN 1740-3111
 Sudan's Hassan Musa on how he shares art on envelopes
 The Hassan Musa Mail Art collection, comprising 70 items of mail art, lino prints and correspondence is held by SOAS Special Collections. Digitised images from the collection are available to view online here.

Calligraphers of Arabic script
Sudanese artists
Living people
1951 births
French artists
Sudanese contemporary artists
Sudanese painters
College of Fine and Applied Art (Khartoum) alumni